Merry Christmas from the Brady Bunch is the debut studio album by American pop group the Brady Bunch. It was released on November 2, 1970, by Paramount Records. As its title suggests, the album consists of Christmas standards performed by the children who played the kids on the ABC sitcom The Brady Bunch.

The album was reissued in 1995 by MCA Records under the title Christmas with the Brady Bunch.

Critical reception
Billboard published a review in the November 14, 1970 issue that said: "With the success of their TV show assured, the Brady Bunch makes their recording debut with a first rate collection of Christmas carols and songs. Their bright and appealing performance of "Jingle Bells", "Santa Claus Is Comin' to Town", and "Rudolph the Red-Nosed Reindeer" are complemented by warm readings of "The Little Drummer Boy", "Silent Night", and "The First Noel". Should prove a solid sales item for this holiday season".

Track listing

Vocalists
 Barry Williams
 Maureen McCormick
 Christopher Knight
 Eve Plumb
 Mike Lookinland
 Susan Olsen

See also
 A Partridge Family Christmas Card

References

1970 debut albums
The Brady Bunch albums
1970 Christmas albums
Christmas albums by American artists
Pop Christmas albums
Paramount Records (1969) albums